Borderland is a 2007 American-Mexican horror film written and directed by Zev Berman. It is loosely based on the true story of Adolfo de Jesús Constanzo, a drug lord and the leader of a religious cult that practiced human sacrifice. Constanzo and his followers, called the Narco-satanists, kidnapped and murdered The University of Texas junior Mark J. Kilroy in the spring of 1989.

Plot
The film  begins with Mexico City policemen banging on the door of what seems to be an abandoned house. Ulises (Damian Alcazar) and his partner enter the house and find gruesome remnants of animal sacrifices and human remains.  The two are ambushed by the occupants and Ulises is forced to watch them torture and mutilate his partner until he is decapitated. Ulises is shot in the leg and is allowed to live to warn other law enforcement officials to stay out of their way.

One year later, Ed (Brian Presley), Henry (Jake Muxworthy) and Phil (Rider Strong), three recent Texas college grads, are enjoying a college beach bonfire in Galveston, Texas. They decide to head down to Mexico for the week to hit up the strip clubs and take advantage of a lack of law enforcement.

Ed meets a bartender named Valeria (Martha Higareda) after being stabbed defending her in a barfight and falls in love with her, while Henry sets Phil up for his first sexual encounter with a prostitute, who is "barely 17". Phil immediately falls in love with the prostitute, who he quickly finds out has a baby. The boys, Valeria and her cousin Lupe (Francesca Guillen) indulge in some hallucinogenic mushrooms before going to a carnival. Phil leaves early to give the prostitute's baby a teddy bear, and as he walks from the carnival alone, Phil reluctantly gets into a car with a couple of men who proceed to abduct him when he tries to leave.

The next morning, Henry and Ed notice that Phil did not come back, and the two begin to investigate, eventually teaming up with Ulises, after Henry gets shot and they find the local authorities and the townspeople utterly terrified of Phil's captors. Phil is revealed to be kept in a shack on a ranch under the watch of Randall (Sean Astin), an American serial killer affiliated with the cult, who wounds Phil after he tries to escape. The captors explain that they follow "some African voodoo" called Palo Myombe and are preparing a human sacrifice (a "gringo", as opposed to the regular Mexican citizens they have been sacrificing) to get the power of Nganga for their drugs to be invisible to the border guards while smuggling them into the US.

Henry is later hacked to death by several men with machetes on the roof of their hotel, and Ed and Valeria decide to go with Ulises to go kill the men who abducted Phil. By then, it is too late to save Phil, however that does not stop Ulises from shooting the leader of the cult to death after being shot himself.

Ed, Valeria, and Ulises travel down the road to a house inhabited by an old man, where Ulises bleeds to death. The cult members followed Ed and Valeria to the house, and the two risk their lives to kill the remaining members, eventually deciding to swim across the Rio Grande, two kilometers north of their location.

The movie ends with a caption explaining that several kilos of cocaine were found in containers along with human hair, over fifty bodies were exhumed from a mass grave at the ranch, Ed and Valeria were questioned after being caught swimming across the river, and that several suspects remain at large.

Cast
Brian Presley as Ed
Rider Strong as Phil
Jake Muxworthy as Henry
Beto Cuevas as Santillan
Martha Higareda as Valeria
Sean Astin as Randall
Mircea Monroe as Nancy
Damián Alcázar as Ulises
Marco Bacuzzi as Gustavo
Roberto Sosa as Luis
José María Yazpik as Zoilo
Humberto Busto as Mario
Elizabeth Cervantes as Anna
Francesca Guillén as Lupe
Alenka Rios as Amelia

Release

The film was selected as one of the "8 Films to Die For" at the After Dark Horrorfest 2007.

Reception

Chloe Pacey from Dread Central gave the film a score of 4/5, commending the film's performances, "realistic" characters, and washed-out, near overexposed look. Scott Collura from IGN commended the film's realistic feel writing, "every once in awhile, a film can defy expectations, and Lionsgate's Borderland is one such case."

References

External links
 
 

2007 films
American slasher films
Crime films based on actual events
Mexican horror thriller films
Mexican slasher films
Films set on farms
Films set in Mexico
2007 horror films
2000s horror thriller films
MoviePass Films films
Films about Mexican drug cartels
2000s English-language films
2000s American films
2000s Mexican films